All Saints' Church, Misterton is a Grade I listed parish church in the Church of England in Misterton, Nottinghamshire, England.

History
The church dates from the 13th century.  It was rebuilt between 1847 and 1848. The east window of the Holy Cross chapel was designed by John Piper and made by his glassmaker, Patrick Reyntiens.

It is part of a joint parish with:
All Saints' Church, Beckingham
St Mary Magdalene's Church, Walkeringham
St Mary the Virgin's Church, West Stockwith

References

Church of England church buildings in Nottinghamshire
Grade I listed churches in Nottinghamshire